Salvatore Bruno (born 9 November 1979) is an Italian footballer who plays as a striker for Italian Serie D club Rezzato .

Club career 
Bruno started his career at Serie A team Napoli, but most of his career has been spent in the lower division.

Chievo 
Bruno was signed by Chievo in co-ownership deal in 1999. In January 2001 Bruno was signed by Alzano in temporary deal, after made a handful appearances with SPAL. In June 2001 Chievp bought Bruno outright. However he was loaned to Ascoli with option to co-own the player. In June 2003 Chievo bought back Bruno again, but Bruno left for Ancona in another temporary deal. Bruno switched clubs every 6 months, which he left for Bari, Torino, Catania and finally played whole season for Brescia. Bruno made 4 appearances for Chievo in 2006–07 Serie A.

Modena 
In January 2007, after a few appearances, he left Serie A team Chievo and moved to Modena, exchanged with Michele Troiano in co-ownership deal.

In June 2008, Modena bought him outright and bought back Troiano, in exchange, Angelo Antonazzo and Nicholas Frey went to Chievo.

Sassuolo 
In August 2010 Bruno was signed by Sassuolo on reported free transfer. The club also signed Troiano from Modena, the seat of the province that Sassuolo is located. Bruno took Riccardo Zampagna's no.9 shirt. However he was the backup striker.

Juve Stabia 
In summer 2012 he moved to Juve Stabia. At the end of the season, he played 26 games with 7 goals.

Back in Modena 
In the summer of 2013 returns to play in the files of Modena in Serie B.

Lega Pro 
The following year falls in the Lega Pro by signing a contract with Real Vicenza; the following year begins to play in the Giana Erminio.

International career 
Bruno was a member of Italy U16 team in 1996 UEFA European Under-16 Football Championship qualification.

References

External links 
 FIGC 
 AIC Profile 

Italian footballers
Italy youth international footballers
S.S.C. Napoli players
Fermana F.C. players
A.C. ChievoVerona players
U.S. Cremonese players
S.P.A.L. players
Virtus Bergamo Alzano Seriate 1909 players
Ascoli Calcio 1898 F.C. players
A.C. Ancona players
S.S.C. Bari players
Catania S.S.D. players
Torino F.C. players
Brescia Calcio players
Modena F.C. players
U.S. Sassuolo Calcio players
S.S. Juve Stabia players
Serie A players
Serie B players
Serie C players
Association football forwards
Footballers from Naples
1979 births
Living people
Real Vicenza V.S. players
A.S. Giana Erminio players